Fly Rasta is the fifth solo studio album by Jamaican reggae artist Ziggy Marley, released on April 15, 2014, on Ziggy's own label, Tuff Gong Worldwide. The album marked Ziggy's return after the Grammy-winning album Ziggy Marley in Concert.

The first single, "I Don't Wanna Live on Mars", was released on iTunes on April 15, 2014 the same day as the album.

Aol.com released the video for "I Don't Wanna Live on Mars" exclusively on their web-page. The music video features his real-life wife and kids in a dream sequence where their family traverses an unhealthy planet Earth. The song and video's imagery convey a unified message from Marley that we should treat the earth well so we do not all have to leave to live on mars.

Track listing
"I Don't Wanna Live on Mars"
"Fly Rasta" (featuring U-Roy)
"Lighthouse"
"Sunshine" 
"Moving Forward" (featuring Beezy Coleman)
"You"
"So Many Rising" 
"I Get Up" (featuring Cedella Marley)
"You're My Yoko"
"Give It Away"

All songs written by David Marley, 2013 Ishti Music (ASCAP) except "Give It Away" written by Jacob Luttrell, Geoffrey Early (APG/SESA/BMI) and David Marley (Ishti Music/ASCAP); and "Lighthouse" written by David Marley (Ishti Music/ASCAP) and Sam Martin (APG/ASCAP)

Credits

Band members
Ziggy Marley - Lead vocals and guitar
Cedella Marley, Sharon Marley, Erica Newell, Tracy Hazzard, Ian "Beezy" Coleman, Vincent Brantley, Sean Dancy, Tim Fowlles - Background vocals
Cedella Marley - Background vocal arrangements
Steve Ferrone, Brian Macleod, James Gadson, Rock Deadrick - Drums
Dave Wilder, Abraham Laboriel, Guy Erez, Paul Stennett - Bass
Zac Rae, Mike Hyde, George Hughes, Dave Palmer, Brian Lebarton - Keyboards
Lyle Workman, Takeshi Akimoto, Ian "Beezy" Coleman - Guitars
Rock Deadrick, Randy Gloss - Percussion
Taku Hirano - Taiko drums
Ronobir Lahiri - Sitar
Todd Simon, Geoff Gallegoi, Fabio Santana, Tracy Wannomae - Horns
Liam McCormick, Owen Sutter - String arrangements

Production
Produced by Ziggy Marley 
Additional production and mastering by Dave Cooley 
Mixed by Andrew Scheps
Engineered by Isha Erskine
Additional engineering by Jared Hirshland
Assistant engineer: Alex Williams
Executive producer: Orly Marley 
Production manager: Matt Solodky
Production assistant: Michelle Rodriguez

Artwork
Art direction and layout by Neville Garrick
Cover artwork and imagery by Souther Salazar
Layout by Rory Wilson

Reception

Critical reception 
Fly Rasta won the Grammy Award for Best Reggae Album in February 2015. It received generally favorable reviews upon its release, with a 63/100 critic score on Metacritic, based on six reviews.

Commercial reception 
In the United States, Fly Rasta debuted at number 129 on the Billboard 200 chart, and number one on the Top Reggae Albums. As of July 2014, the album had sold 25,000 copies in the United States.

Charts

Weekly charts

Year-end charts

References

External links
Album at Ziggy Marley's official website

Ziggy Marley albums
2014 albums
Tuff Gong albums
Grammy Award for Best Reggae Album